Deeks is a surname. Notable people with the surname include:

 Barbara Ann Deeks (born 1937), birth name of British actress Barbara Windsor
 Don Deeks (1923–1995), American footballer
 Florence Deeks (1864–1959), Canadian teacher and author
 John Deeks (born 1951), Australian television presenter

Fictional characters 
 Marty Deeks, a character in the television series NCIS: Los Angeles

See also 
 Nick Simpson-Deeks (born 1980), Australian actor
 Robert de Castella (born 1957), Australian marathon runner, nicknamed "Deeks"

References 

English-language surnames